Velocious Technologies (known as VeeR VR).

History
Veer VR is the global VR content community founded in 2016. The three co-founders have been featured by Forbes 30 under 30 Asia 2018 as honourees for the consumer technology sector, become the only founders of virtual reality technology company to make the list this year.

Products
As of March 2018, Veer VR offered 2 apps for Android and iOS: VeeR VR for making 360 degrees and VR videos & photos  and VeeR Editor for editing them.

References

Mobile video editing software
2016 establishments in China
Companies based in Beijing